Melbournopterus is a genus of prehistoric chelicerate or brachiopod, known from the Upper Silurian of Australia. It is of uncertain taxonomic placement within the subphylum Chelicerata. Lamsdell, Percival and Poschmann (2013) argued that Melbournopterus crossotus is not a chelicerate at all, and interpreted its type specimen as the dorsal valve of a craniate brachiopod.

Description
If Melbournopterus is a chelicerate, it is distinguished by its prosoma (head), which is bell-shaped and emarginate in front, with subrectangular compound eyes located posteriorly on the prosoma, which strongly converge anteriorly.  It was small in size, and its abdomen and appendages are unknown.

Species
Melbournopterus Caster & Kjellesvig-Waering, 1953 
M. crossotus, Caster & Kjellesvig-Waering, 1953, Upper Silurian, Australia

References

Prehistoric protostome genera
Prehistoric invertebrates of Oceania
Silurian animals of Australia